Lomechusoides is a genus of beetles belonging to the family Staphylinidae.

The species of this genus are found in Europe.

Species:
 Lomechusoides amurensis (Wasmann, 1897) 
 Lomechusoides inflatus (Zetterstedt, 1828)

References

Staphylinidae
Staphylinidae genera